Heat Wave is a 2011 French drama film and the directorial debut of Jean-Jacques Jauffret. It was screened in the Directors' Fortnight section at the 2011 Cannes Film Festival.

Cast 
 Adèle Haenel as Amélie  
 Sylvie Lachat as Anne 
 Ulysse Grosjean as Luigi 
 Yves Ruellan as Georges 
 Julien Bodet as Stéphane

References

External links 
 

2011 films
2011 drama films
2010s French-language films
French drama films
2011 directorial debut films
2010s French films